Marwan Maalouf (born November 26, 1976) is an American football coach from Lebanon. He formerly was the special teams coordinator for the Indianapolis Colts and the Minnesota Vikings.

Playing career
In college, Maalouf earned three letters while playing guard for Baldwin Wallace University from 1997 until 1999. He was a two-time All-Ohio Athletic Conference selection. In addition, he was named Baldwin-Wallace's Outstanding Offensive Lineman and was elected as a team captain for his senior season.

Coaching career
Maalouf began his NFL coaching career with the Cleveland Browns. Following his three-year stint with Cleveland, he spent the 2007 NFL season writing scouting reports for Scouts Inc. and ESPN. He returned to coaching the following year as the assistant special teams coach for the Baltimore Ravens. In the 2012 NFL season, he left the Ravens along with Chuck Pagano when the Indianapolis Colts named him special teams coordinator. He was let go  after one year and began coaching for the Miami Dolphins, until being hired by the Vikings for the 2019 NFL season. After the 2020 season, his contract wasn’t renewed by the Vikings and he was replaced by Ryan Ficken.

References

External links
Minnesota Vikings bio

1976 births
Living people
American football offensive guards
American people of Lebanese descent
Baldwin Wallace University alumni
Baltimore Ravens coaches
Cleveland Browns coaches
Cleveland Browns scouts
Fordham Rams football coaches
Indianapolis Colts coaches
Miami Dolphins coaches
Minnesota Vikings coaches
Rutgers Scarlet Knights football coaches
Rutgers Scarlet Knights coaches
Sportspeople of Lebanese descent
Sportspeople from Beirut